Kuressaare Airport is an airport in Estonia.

Overview
The first runway was built in the last half of the 1930s. The airport was opened officially on 6 March 1945. The air traffic increased during the proceeding years and between 1949 and 1953 there were between 10 and 14 daily flights between Kuressaare and Tallinn. During this period, around 400 passengers flew to or from Kuressaare daily. The airport did not get electricity until 1958. The present terminal building was built in 1962. The second runway 05/23 was built in 1976 and in 1999 the main runway was lengthened. The terminal building was modernized in 2007.

The airport is owned by AS Tallinna Lennujaam, which also owns Ruhnu Airfield.

19,702 passengers travelled via Kuressaare Airport in 2010.

Airlines and destinations

Statistics
 List of the busiest airports in the Baltic states

References

External links
 Official website of Kuressaare Airport

Airports in Estonia
Airports built in the Soviet Union
Buildings and structures in Saaremaa
1940s establishments in Estonia
Kuressaare
Airports established in 1945